Pocahontas is a city in Randolph County, Arkansas, United States, along the Black River. According to the 2010 Census Bureau, the population of the city was 6,608.  The city is the county seat of Randolph County.

Pocahontas has a number of historic buildings, including the Old Randolph County Courthouse built in 1871, the St. Mary's AME Church, and the Pocahontas Colored School built in 1918, the latter of which is now home to the Eddie Mae Herron Center.

History

This city was named after the Native American from Jamestown, Virginia. A statue of her is located in Overlook Park along the Black River.

The family of Dr. Ransom S. Bettis is given the credit for being the first settlers on the land now called Pocahontas. Dr. Bettis' daughter, Cinderella, married Thomas S. Drew, and lived on 800 acres where the town of Biggers now exists. Bettis and Drew led the founding of Pocahontas as the county seat of Randolph County.

Randolph County is famous for many "firsts"; Arkansas' oldest town, Davidsonville, was established in 1815. The first Arkansas post office was built in Davidsonville in 1817, and the first state courthouse was established in 1818. The earliest land claim was in 1809 near what is now Ravenden Springs. The first actual term of court convened in Arkansas was in 1815 in a part of Lawrence County that was given over to Randolph County. And the country's first overland route, the Natchitoches Trail, went through parts of Randolph County.

In 1835, the Territorial Legislature granted the formation of Randolph County from part of the area then called Lawrence County. The county was named after John Randolph, who was one of the first settlers in the area.

Randolph County encompasses the rolling hills of the Ozarks to the west and rich, flat farmland of the Mississippi Delta to the east. Five rivers flow through the county, providing access to fishing and canoeing. Soybeans, rice, and other grains are the principal crops in the Delta region, while cattle ranching dominates the hill country. The poultry industry is also a vital part of the area economy. 

During the early part of the Civil War, Camp Shaver, located in Pocahontas, was the headquarters for Confederate forces west of the Mississippi River.

The industrial base is diversified, with products such as shoes, large truck trailers, technical components for communications, picture frames, golf bags and luggage, tool boxes, wood products and more.

Pocahontas is the county seat with a population of 6,616. The other 10,407 residents of Randolph County live in rural areas and five incorporated communities - Maynard, Biggers, Reyno, Ravenden Springs and O'Kean.

Local legend holds that Pocahontas was named the county seat through an act of trickery. Supposedly, at the county meeting to determine which city would receive the title, the delegation from Pocahontas brought in large quantities of alcohol and distributed them to the other delegations. When the time came to vote, the only delegation not passed out or otherwise influenced was that from Pocahontas.

Geography
Pocahontas is located at  (36.263560, -90.973349).

Climate
The climate of the city is characterized by relatively high temperatures and evenly distributed precipitation throughout the year.  The Köppen climate classification subtype for this climate is "Cfa" (humid subtropical climate).

Demographics

2020 census

As of the 2020 United States census, there were 7,371 people, 2,748 households, and 1,575 families residing in the city.

2000 census
As of the census of 2000, 6,518 people, 2,693 households, and 1,742 families resided in the city. The 2,924 housing units averaged a density of 397.7 per square mile (153.6/km). The racial makeup of the city was 97.27% Caucasian, 1.10% African American, 0.44% Native American, 0.08% Asian, 0.20% from other races, and 0.91% from two or more races, with about 0.89% of the population Hispanic or Latino of any race.

Of the 2,693 households, 30.0% had children under the age of 18 living with them, 48.0% were married couples living together, 13.1% had a female householder with no husband present, and 35.3% were not families. Around 31.9% of all households were made up of individuals, and 17.3% had someone living alone who was 65 years of age or older. The average household size was 2.32 and the average family size was 2.94.

In the city, the population was distributed as 23.7% under the age of 18, 9.7% from 18 to 24, 25.5% from 25 to 44, 20.1% from 45 to 64, and 21.0% who were 65 years of age or older. The median age was 38 years. For every 100 females, there were 84.6 males. For every 100 females age 18 and over, there were 78.5 males.

The median income for a household in the city was $24,450, and for a family was $29,525. Males had a median income of $26,382 versus $18,750 for females. The per capita income for the city was $15,529. About 15.6% of families and 18.8% of the population were below the poverty line, including 24.9% of those under age 18 and 16.5% of those age 65 or over.

Education
Pocahontas is home to the Pocahontas School District. Public schools include Alma Spikes Elementary School, M. D. Williams Intermediate School, Pocahontas Junior High School, and Pocahontas High School. Pocahontas' school mascot is the Redskins. Pocahontas is also home to St. Paul Elementary School, a private Catholic school serving pre-kindergarten through sixth grade. St Paul's mascot is the Sabers.

Pocahontas is the home of Black River Technical College.

Media

Newspapers
The Pocahontas Star Herald is published weekly, on Thursdays. It began publication in 1880, and is owned by Corning Publishing.

Radio stations
Pocahontas is home to KPOC/KRLW/KIYS radio stations. The stations' "better known names" are: KPOC-FM is better known as Lite 104.1 FM; KPOC is News Sports Talk 1420 AM; KIYS is Country 106.3 FM; and KRLW is Oldies 1320 AM. While the KRLW and KIYS radio stations are broadcast centrally to the Walnut Ridge/Hoxie area (a community some 15 miles away), the broadcasting site and main offices are centered with KPOC inside Pocahontas. The stations are operated by Combined Media Group Inc.

Infrastructure

Highways 

 
 
 Highway 90
 Highway 115
 Highway 166
 Highway 251
 Highway 304

Medical care 

 St. Bernards Five Rivers Medical Center
 Pocahontas Medical Clinic

Airport 

Pocahontas Municipal Airport (M70)

Notable people
William Herbert Allaire Jr.- U.S. Army general
Larry P. Arnn, a Pocahontas native, president of Hillsdale College, Hillsdale, Mich.
Edwin Bethune, a former member of the United States House of Representatives, graduated from Pocahontas High School
Drew Bowers, Arkansas Republican politician and lawyer, was born near Pocahontas in 1886.
Linda Collins-Smith, Republican member of the Arkansas Senate and owner of Days Inn in Pocahontas.
Jim Johnston, former composer for World Wrestling Entertainment
Billy Lee Riley, Pocahontas native and American rockabilly musician, singer
Wear Schoonover, Pocahontas native, was the first University of Arkansas athlete in any sport named to an All-American team.

References

External links
 Ozark weather and radar
 Randolph County Heritage Museum
 Downtown Art Association of Pocahontas
 Eddie Mae Herron Center - Museum of African American History and Heritage and Community Center
 Randolph County Tourism Association
 Pocahontas Star Herald newspaper
 Encyclopedia of Arkansas History & Culture entry: Pocahontas (Randolph County)

Cities in Randolph County, Arkansas
Cities in Arkansas
Arkansas placenames of Native American origin
County seats in Arkansas